Hernando Hernández (14 November 1910 – 16 January 1968) was a Cuban sports shooter. He competed in the 25 m pistol event at the 1948 Summer Olympics.

References

1910 births
1968 deaths
Cuban male sport shooters
Olympic shooters of Cuba
Shooters at the 1948 Summer Olympics
Place of birth missing
20th-century Cuban people